Ill Wind is a 2007 French film written and directed by Stéphane Allagnon. Sent to repair the computers at a supermarket in a town hit by a storm, a technician discovers some unusual things and is faced with difficult decisions.

Plot
Stephane Allagnon's crime comedy Before the Storm stars Jonathan Zaccai as Frank, a tech worker assigned to fix the aged computer system of a store after a weather incident knocked it out. During the work, he uncovers a piece of code that embezzled money from the company. When the number one suspect turns up dead, Frank finds himself trying to piece together who is responsible with the help of some quirky locals.

External links
 Variety review by Eddie Cockrell
 
 Answers.com by Perry Seibert

2007 films
French crime comedy films
2000s French-language films
2000s French films